WNIR-LP (95.5 FM) is a radio station licensed to serve Newberry, South Carolina. The station is owned by Newberry College. It airs a college radio format.

The station was assigned the WNIR-LP call letters by the Federal Communications Commission on January 20, 2005.

References

External links
WNIR-LP official website
 

NIR-LP
NIR-LP
NIR-LP
Radio stations established in 2005
2005 establishments in South Carolina
Newberry College